State Highway 352 (SH 352) is a Texas state highway running from Dallas east through Mesquite before finally ending in Sunnyvale.  The route mainly runs along Scyene Rd.  The highway was designated on October 6, 1943 from U.S. Highway 80 in Mesquite west to U.S. Highway 175 southeast of Dallas, replacing part of SH 183 when it was relocated to the north, and was extended into Dallas on February 17, 1964 when US 175 was relocated to the west. On June 25, 1991, the section of SH 352 from I-30 to the old route of US 80 was cancelled and removed from the state highway system.

Part of State Highway 352 runs in front of the State Fair of Texas, over a stretch named Robert B. Cullum Boulevard.

Route description
SH 352 begins 0.4 miles east of I-30 in Dallas at the corner of 1st Avenue and Parry Avenue adjacent to Dallas Fair Park, and  it heads east through Dallas to an intersection with Loop 12.  The highway continues to the east to an intersection with I-635 in Mesquite.  SH 352 reaches its eastern terminus at US 80 in Sunnyvale.

Major junctions

References

352
Highways in Dallas
Transportation in Dallas County, Texas